Emergenetics International is an organizational development company. Emergenetics International uses psychometric research and behavioral studies to advise and consult with businesses and individuals on how to assess human capital. Based out of North America, the company also operates in Asia and Europe. Since 2011, Emergenetics International has been ranked on Inc. Magazine's "Inc. 5000" list of the fastest growing companies in the country seven times.

The company works with businesses, individuals, and schools. Emergenetics International was founded by CEO Geil Browning, Ph.D. in 1991. Browning developed the Emergenetics Profile with Wendell Williams, Ph.D., that includes an assessment test to designate individuals by four thinking attributes, analytical, structural, social and conceptual, and three behavioral attributes, expressiveness, assertiveness and flexibility. Emergenetics measures distinct behaviors with four commonly identifiable patterns of thinking. The company began certifying trainers, human resource professionals and coaches in 1998 and has since profiled thousands of individuals globally.

References

Consulting firms established in 1991
1991 establishments in Colorado